The Venezuela women's national basketball team is administered by the Federación Venezolana de Baloncesto.

FIBA Americas Championship record
 1999 – 8th place
 2009 – 7th place
 2013 – 8th place
 2015 – 5th place
 2017 – 9th place
 2021 – 6th place

Current roster
Rostrer for the 2021 FIBA Women's AmeriCup.

See also
 Venezuela women's national under-19 basketball team
 Venezuela women's national under-17 basketball team
 Venezuela women's national 3x3 team

References

External links

FIBA profile
Venezuela Republic at FIBA Americas
Presentation at Latinbasket.com

 
Women's national basketball teams
Women's national basketball teams in South America